Life of a Don (also abbreviated to L.O.A.D.) is the second studio album by American singer and rapper Don Toliver. It was released on October 8, 2021, through Cactus Jack Records, Atlantic Records, and We Run It. The production on the album was handled by multiple producers, including Mike Dean, Mustard, Metro Boomin, Allen Ritter, Hit-Boy, Cardo, and Sonny Digital, among others. The album also features guest appearances from Travis Scott, Kali Uchis, Baby Keem, HVN, and SoFaygo.

Life of a Don was supported by two singles: "What You Need" and "Drugs n Hella Melodies". The album received generally positive reviews from music critics and was a commercial success. It debuted at number two on the US Billboard 200 chart, earning 68,000 album-equivalent units in its first week.

Release and promotion
On February 2, 2021, Don Toliver cryptically announced Life of a Don via Twitter. Toliver's Cactus Jack Records label boss, American rapper and singer Travis Scott, teased his excitement and involvement in the album in a tweet on April 9. Toliver had previously planned to release the album in July 2021. On September 28, Toliver announced the release date of the album and revealed its cover art a few hours later. He also teased the opening track, "Xscape", in a trailer video of the album. To support the album, Toliver went on tour with American rapper Bia, serving as a special guest.

Singles
Two singles preceded the release of the album. The lead single, "What You Need", was released on May 4, 2021. The second single, "Drugs n Hella Melodies", featuring Toliver's girlfriend, Colombian-American singer Kali Uchis, was released on June 18, 2021. Both music videos were filmed in Colombia and released alongside the songs on their respective release dates.

Critical reception

Life of a Don was met with generally positive reviews. At Metacritic, which assigns a normalized rating out of 100 to reviews from professional publications, the album received an average score of 73, based on four reviews.

Commercial performance 
Life of a Don debuted at number two on the US Billboard 200 chart, earning 68,000 album-equivalent units, (including 18,000 copies in pure album sales) in its first week. This became Toliver's second US top-ten debut on the chart and highest-charting album to date. The album also accumulated a total of 64.13 million on-demand streams from the album's songs.

Track listing

Notes
 "Xscape", "Outerspace", and "Bogus" are stylized in all caps.

Charts

Weekly charts

Year-end charts

References

 

2021 albums
Don Toliver albums
Atlantic Records albums
Albums produced by Cardo (record producer)
Albums produced by Hit-Boy
Albums produced by DJ Dahi